Juan "Juanito" Antonio Felipe Gallego (born 24 August 1961) is a Spanish former professional footballer who played as a defender. He competed in the men's tournament at the 1980 Summer Olympics.

References

External links
 

1961 births
Living people
Spanish footballers
Association football defenders
Spain under-21 international footballers
Spain youth international footballers
Olympic footballers of Spain
Footballers at the 1980 Summer Olympics
Footballers from Madrid
La Liga players
Segunda División players
Real Madrid Castilla footballers
Real Madrid CF players
Real Oviedo players
Rayo Vallecano players